The Divizia A1 is the women's top Romanian professional volleyball league.

Past winners

See also
 Romanian Men's Volleyball League

External links 
 Romanian Volleyball Federation
 Primul portal din voleiul românesc First portal of Romanian volleyball
  Romanian League. women.volleybox.net 

 
Volleyball in Romania
Romania
Romania
Women's sports leagues in Romania
Professional sports leagues in Romania